"Tyler Herro" is a song by American rapper Jack Harlow. It was released on October 22, 2020, by Generation Now and Atlantic Records, as a lead single from his debut studio album Thats What They All Say (2020). The song pays tribute to the basketball player of the same name and was produced by Boi-1da and Scott Storch, with additional production from Neenyo and Jahaan Sweet.

Composition and lyrics
The song features a "bass-heavy midtempo groove that highlights Harlow's catchy flows". Jack Harlow pays homage to the NBA player Tyler Herro, a friend of his, rapping: "My homeboy Tyler he play in South Beach / He told me this summer he gon' fix my jumper". He also mentions having made a new group of friends: "I brought a gang to the party with me / Five white boys, but they not NSYNC".

Music video
The music video was released alongside the single. It was directed by Ace Pro and filmed in the home of basketball player Lou Williams in Atlanta. The video begins with a child resembling Jack Harlow getting off the school bus and running towards his home. It then cuts to Harlow enjoying his life in fame. He shoots hoops with Tyler Herro, goes through a "wardrobe change", and is also seen on a bed with two girls having a pillow fight. Harlow also introduces his rap group The Homies. The visual features a cameo from comedian Druski.

Charts

Weekly charts

Year-end charts

Certifications

References

2020 singles
2020 songs
Jack Harlow songs
Atlantic Records singles
Songs about basketball players
Song recordings produced by Boi-1da
Song recordings produced by Scott Storch
Songs written by Boi-1da
Songs written by Jack Harlow
Songs written by Scott Storch